Wajda is a Polish surname that is also used in parts of Eastern Europe outside of Poland. Notable persons with the name include:

 Andrzej Wajda (1926–2016), Polish film director
 Kazimierz Wajda aka "Szczepko" (1905–1955), Polish actor and comedian
 Julia Wajda (born 1990), Polish ski mountaineer
 Patryk Wajda (born 1988), Polish ice hockey player
 Krystyna Zachwatowicz-Wajda (born 1930), Polish scenographer

See also
 

Polish-language surnames